The 2020 Kennesaw State Owls football team represented Kennesaw State University in the 2020 NCAA Division I FCS football season. They were led by sixth-year head coach Brian Bohannon and played their home games at Fifth Third Bank Stadium in Kennesaw, Georgia as sixth-year members of the Big South Conference.

Preseason

Polls
In June 2020, the Owls were predicted to finish first in the Big South by a panel of media and head coaches.

Schedule
Kennesaw State had games scheduled against , Hampton, Alabama State and Tarleton State, but they were canceled due to the COVID-19 pandemic.

References

Kennesaw State
Kennesaw State Owls football seasons
Kennesaw State Owls football